Kumdang-2 is an alleged cure for AIDS, Ebola, MERS, and tuberculosis created in North Korea. According to the website Minjok Tongshin, a version of the drug was originally produced in 1996. The name means "golden sugar" in Korean.

It is manufactured by the Pugang Pharmaceutical Company. According to the Korean Central News Agency, the drug's ingredients include ginseng, small amounts of rare earth metals, and trace amounts of gold and platinum. According to the KCNA, it can also cure cancer, morning sickness, and "harm from the use of computers". The drug was mentioned during the deadly bird flu outbreaks in 2006 and 2013.

Chemical analysis
According to the chemical analysis by the South Korean National Forensic Service, Kumdang-2 turned out to be mostly made of the anesthetic Procaine.

See also
 Koryo medicine
 Neo-Viagra-Y.R.
 Royal Blood-Fresh
 Tetrodocain

References

Healthcare in North Korea
Drugs